Filling His Own Shoes is a 1917 American silent comedy film directed by Harry Beaumont and starring Bryant Washburn, Hazel Daly and Rod La Rocque.

Cast
 Bryant Washburn as William Ruggles
 Hazel Daly as Ruth Downing
 Rod La Rocque as Dick Downing 
 Lyda Dalzell as Dorothea Westbrooke 
 Virginia Valli as Roxana
 Helen Ferguson as Rosa
 Louise Long as Bulbul

References

Bibliography
 Goble, Alan. The Complete Index to Literary Sources in Film. Walter de Gruyter, 1999.

External links
 

1917 films
1917 comedy films
1910s English-language films
American silent feature films
Silent American comedy films
American black-and-white films
Films directed by Harry Beaumont
Essanay Studios films
1910s American films